Charles Wyndham, 2nd Earl of Egremont, PC (19 August 171021 August 1763), of Orchard Wyndham in Somerset, Petworth House in Sussex, and of Egremont House in Mayfair, London, was a British statesman who served as Secretary of State for the Southern Department from 1761–63.

Origins
He was the eldest son and heir of Sir William Wyndham, 3rd Baronet (c. 16881740) of Orchard Wyndham, Secretary at War in 1712, Chancellor of the Exchequer in 1713 and Tory leader in the House of Commons during the reign of King George I (1714–1727) and during the early years of King George II (1727–1760). His mother was Catherine Seymour, daughter of Charles Seymour, 6th Duke of Somerset (1662–1748), KG, and sister of Algernon Seymour, 7th Duke of Somerset (1684–1750), created in 1749 Earl of Egremont and Baron Cockermouth, with special remainder to his nephew Charles Wyndham, subject of this article.

Inheritance
He succeeded to the Orchard Wyndham estates and as 4th baronet on his father's death in 1740 and in 1750 succeeded by special remainder as 2nd Earl of Egremont,  on the death of his uncle Algernon Seymour, 7th Duke of Somerset, 1st Earl of Egremont, and received as his share of the Seymour inheritance the former Percy estates including Egremont Castle in Cumbria, Leconfield Castle in Yorkshire and the palatial Petworth House in Sussex (rebuilt by the 6th Duke). These were formerly owned by the Percy family, and had been inherited by the 7th Duke of Somerset from his mother Lady Elizabeth Percy (died 1722), daughter and heiress of Joceline Percy, 11th Earl of Northumberland. His younger brother was Percy Wyndham-O'Brien, 1st Earl of Thomond, created Earl of Thomond, having become the chosen heir of his mother's sister's childless husband Henry O'Brien, 8th Earl of Thomond (1688–1741).

Career
Wyndham served as Member of Parliament for Bridgwater (Somerset) in 1734–1741, Appleby (Cumberland) in 1741–1747, and for Taunton (Somerset) in 1747–1750.

Seven Years War

In October 1761 he was appointed Secretary of State for the Southern Department in succession to William Pitt, 1st Earl of Chatham. His term of office, during which he acted in concert with his brother-in-law George Grenville, was mainly occupied with the declaration of war on Spain and with the negotiations for peace with France and Spain, the terms of which Wyndham seems to have disliked. He was also involved with the proceedings against John Wilkes. He was Lord Lieutenant of Cumberland 1751-1763 and Lord Lieutenant of Sussex 1762–1763.

Marriage and progeny
On 12 March 1750/51 Wyndham married Hon. Alicia Maria Carpenter, a daughter of George Carpenter, 2nd Baron Carpenter of Killaghy, by his wife Elizabeth Petty. He had progeny including:
George O'Brien Wyndham, 3rd Earl of Egremont (18 December 1751 – 11 November 1837).
Elizabeth Alicia Maria Wyndham (1752 – 10 February 1826), who married Henry Herbert, 1st Earl of Carnarvon, and had children.
Frances Wyndham (9 July 1755 – 15 January 1795), who married Charles Marsham, later Earl of Romney, and had children.
Charlotte Catherine Wyndham (5 September 1756April 1757).
Percy Charles Wyndham (27 September 17575 August 1833).
Charles William Wyndham (8 October 17601 July 1828).
William Frederick Wyndham (6 April 1763 – 11 February 1828), who married Frances Mary Harford, daughter of Frederick Calvert, 6th Baron Baltimore, and had children; his second wife was Julia de Smorzewska, Countess de Spyterki, by whom he also had children.

Death
He died on 21 August 1763.

Assessment
According to the Encyclopædia Britannica Eleventh Edition, Horace Walpole perhaps rated Egremont's talents too low when he said he had neither knowledge of business, nor the smallest share of parliamentary abilities.

References

External links 

|-

|-

|-

1710 births
1763 deaths
British Secretaries of State
Wyndham, Charles
Earls of Egremont
Lord-Lieutenants of Cumberland
Lord-Lieutenants of Sussex
Wyndham, Charles
Members of the Privy Council of Great Britain
British MPs 1734–1741
British MPs 1741–1747
British MPs 1747–1754
Charles
Leaders of the House of Lords